Simon Gerada (born 20 March 1981) is a right-handed Australian/Maltese Table Tennis Player. His father, Joe Gerada was born in Malta and emigrated to Australia in the 1980s. Simon Gerada was born and brought up in Melbourne, Australia and began playing at the age of 9 after he witnessed his father win a shopping centre tournament. He represented Victoria in national junior tournaments. He also competed at the 2000 Summer Olympics.

2001 Commonwealth and World Table Tennis Championships Controversy 

Gerada represented Australia in the Sydney Olympics as a 19-year-old.

After having played in Europe subsequently to the Sydney Olympics, Gerada had returned to Australia by 12 January 2001.

In early February 2001, Gerada joined the National Training Squad to prepare for the 2001 Commonwealth and World Championships.

On 12 February 2001, Gerada attended the first training session of the National Training Squad, but then requested a meeting with Table Tennis Australia and the Victorian Institute of Sport to discuss his training requirements. The meeting requested by Gerada was held on 15 February 2001. The Victorian Institute of Sport suggested a variation to Gerada's training requirements. Table Tennis Australia and Gerada agreed to this variation. However, a few days later, Gerada withdrew from the National Training Squad.

Participation in the training of the National Training Squad was an eligibility requirement for selection in the National Team for the 2001 Commonwealth and World Championships. As Gerada had not complied with that eligibility requirement, he was not considered for selection in the National Team.

Gerada subsequently decided to represent Malta instead of Australia.

In Melbourne in 2006, he teamed up with his elder brother Wayne  representing Malta in the Table tennis doubles.

In 2010, he returned to representing Australia in New Delhi, where, among the four categories he enlisted in, he teamed up with Justin Han in the men's doubles and pushed Sharath Kamal and Subhajit Saha of India before losing in full five games at the round of 16.

References 

Table tennis players at the 2000 Summer Olympics
Olympic table tennis players of Australia
1981 births
Living people
Commonwealth Games competitors for Malta
Commonwealth Games competitors for Australia
Table tennis players at the 2006 Commonwealth Games
Table tennis players at the 2010 Commonwealth Games
Australian male table tennis players